Vanguard SLV-6, also called Vanguard Satellite Launch Vehicle-Six, hoped to be the third successful flight of the American Vanguard rocket following the successful Vanguard 2 satellite on rocket Vanguard SLV-4. Vanguard Satellite Launch Vehicle-6 (SLV-6) was designed to carry a small spherical satellite into Earth orbit to study solar heating of Earth and the heat balance. A faulty second stage pressure valve caused a mission failure.

Launch vehicle 
Vanguard was the designation used for both the launch vehicle and the satellite. The first stage of the three-stage Vanguard Test Vehicle was powered by a General Electric X-405  thrust liquid rocket engine, propelled by kerosene (RP-1) and liquid oxygen, with helium pressurant.

This stage contained the complete guidance and control system.

The thin  steel casing for the third stage had a hemispherical forward dome with a shaft at the center to support the satellite and an aft dome fairing into a steel exit nozzle.

This was the same launch vehicle configuration, with minor modifications, as used for Vanguard TV-3 and all succeeding Vanguard flights up to this one.

Spacecraft 
The shell was composed of magnesium alloy and the interior was pressurized. The payload instrumentation package was mounted in the center of the sphere. The package was arranged in a cylindrical stack with mercury batteries at the bottom, followed by the Minitrack tracking system electronics, the environment electronics, the telemetering instrumentation, and the experiment electronics. Below the package at the bottom of the sphere was the separation device, a spring loaded tube with a timer designed to push the satellite away from the third stage after orbit was reached. At the top of the interior of the sphere was a pressure gauge. Four  spring-loaded metal rods were folded along the equator of the sphere and would protrude radially outward when deployed, acting as a turnstile antenna. Mounted at the end of each antenna rod was a thermistor to measure solar heating processes. Two transmitters were used, one of 10 mW broadcasting at 108.00 MHz and one of 100 mW at 108.03 MHz.

Launch 
Vanguard SLV-6 launched on 22 June 1959 at 20:16:09 GMT. It was launched from Launch Complex 18A (LC-18A) at the Cape Canaveral Air Force Station (CCAFS). The second stage helium control bottle valve failed to open properly at engine start. Tank and chamber pressures rapidly decayed during second stage burn, and 40 seconds after engine start, the helium bottle ruptured due to pressure buildup. The third stage then separated and ignited, driving itself and the satellite into the Atlantic Ocean  downrange.

See also 

 Vanguard rocket
 Project Vanguard
 Comparison of orbital launch systems
 Comparison of orbital rocket engines
 Rocket
 Spacecraft propulsion

References

Further reading 
 Mallove, Eugene F. and Matloff, Gregory L. The Starflight Handbook: A Pioneer's Guide to Interstellar Travel, Wiley, 

Spacecraft launched in 1959
Project Vanguard
Satellite launch failures
Space accidents and incidents in the United States